The Great Bristol Half Marathon is an annual road running event held on the streets of Bristol, UK. The route is at sea level and starts on Anchor Road outside We The Curious. Participants make their way toward Hotwells before heading under the Clifton Suspension Bridge and along the Portway toward Sea Mills before returning the same way then navigating around Cumberland Basin then along Spike Island before crossing Prince Street Bridge, circling Queen Square then heading to Castle Park via St Mary Redcliffe and Temple Circus. The final mile and a half take place in the Old City and Bristol city centre before crossing the finish line back at Anchor Road.

The runner's village is located at Millennium Square.

Race history

Bristol Marathon
The half-marathon had been preceded locally by the Bristol Marathon, which was first run in 1982. In 2014, a new marathon was launched in Bristol. Organised by Go2Events, the Bristol + Bath Marathon follows much of the Bristol Half Marathon route before heading out of the city through South Gloucestershire and into Bath finishing at Royal Victoria Park. The inaugural event took place on 25 October 2015.

Bristol Half Marathon
The first Bristol Half Marathon was held in 1989, with just 1,000 runners competing. The event grew with 12,000 competitors in 2005, 15,000 in 2006 and 16,000 in 2009, a figure around which the participation level has settled.

In the 1992 race, two Kenyan teammates finished first with the same time. Gideon Mutisya and David Mungai shared the 1:04:08 course-record time, though Mutisya was declared winner.

Notable editions of the race include 1997, when the event was titled 'The Cabot 500 Run Through History' to celebrate the 500th anniversary of John Cabot's first voyage to Newfoundland in 1497 and 2001, when the Bristol Half Marathon was also the 10th IAAF World Half Marathon Championships, and attracted competitors such as Haile Gebrselassie and Paula Radcliffe.

In 2007 the race incorporated the UK Athletics team selection trial for the 2007 IAAF World Road Running Championships, as well as the Amateur Athletic Association championship half marathon.

The first fatality in the race occurred in 2011, when a male runner collapsed and died.

The names of various sponsors have prefixed the title of the race in the past, with names including the BUPA Bristol Half Marathon, the Reebok Bristol Half Marathon and the Run Bristol Half Marathon, being sponsored by Bristol City Council. On 14 December 2015, it was announced from 2016 the event, alongside sister event the Bristol 10k, would be organised by Great Run and renamed the Great Bristol Half Marathon.

In 2011 a business challenge was introduced, to stimulate participation by colleagues within Bristol companies.

Past winners

Key:

All information taken from runbristol, ARRS and This is Bristol

Notes

See also
 2001 IAAF World Half Marathon Championships
 Bristol + Bath Marathon

References

External links
Official Website
BBC race coverage
bristolhalfmarathon.co.uk (unofficial Bristol Half Marathon website, Internet Archive)

Half marathons in the United Kingdom
Sports competitions in Bristol
Bristol Harbourside
Athletics competitions in England